Mahmoud Abou-Regaila (born 9 September 1941), also known as Abo Regala, is a former Egyptian footballer and former head coach of Zamalek. He played on a number of teams, including the Egyptian national team. He received honours as a player in the 1965 Pan Arab Games and as a manager in the 1999 Egypt Cup.

Honours

Player
Egypt
Pan Arab Games
 1965

Zamalek SC
Egyptian Premier League
 1959–60, 1963–64, 1964–65
Egypt Cup
 1959–60, 1961–62

Head coach
Zamalek SC
Egyptian Premier League
 1983–84
Egypt Cup
 1998–99
African Cup of Champions Clubs
 1984
Al Nassr FC
Saudi Professional League 
 1975

References

1941 births
Footballers from Cairo
Egyptian footballers
Egypt international footballers
Zamalek SC players
Al Shabab FC (Riyadh) managers
Al Nassr FC managers
Zamalek SC managers
Al-Wehda Club (Mecca) managers
Al Aluminium SC managers
Al Masry SC managers
Yemen national football team managers
Ohod Club managers
Living people
Egyptian Premier League players
Saudi Professional League managers
Association football defenders
Egyptian football managers
Expatriate football managers in Saudi Arabia
Expatriate football managers in Syria
Expatriate football managers in Yemen
Egyptian expatriate sportspeople in Saudi Arabia
Egyptian expatriate sportspeople in Syria
Egyptian expatriate sportspeople in Yemen